AF Corse is an Italian auto racing team founded by former racing driver Amato Ferrari in 1995 in Piacenza.  Strongly linked to the Maserati and Ferrari brands, AF Corse currently competes in the FIA World Endurance Championship, GT World Challenge Europe, European Le Mans Series, Asian Le Mans Series, DTM, and International GT Open, and are four-time champions of the GT2 class of the former FIA GT Championship.  The team has also entered cars under Advanced Engineering, AT Racing, Pecom Racing, Spirit of Race, Formula Racing, 8Star Motorsports and MR Racing, and in association with Michael Waltrip Racing (AF Waltrip).

History
In 1995, Amato Ferrari (no relation to the family of Enzo Ferrari and his Ferrari car company) retired from driving and chose to concentrate on team management, initially entering the Italian Superturismo Championship.  Following the series' demise in 1999, Ferrari launched a new team known as AF Corse, named for his initials.  The team turned to sports car racing, and within a year was contracted by Maserati.  AF Corse was tasked with the development, maintenance, and transport of the Trofeo Cup, a one-make series based on the Maserati Coupé.  The company would continue in this position until 2005.

During 2004, Maserati approached AF Corse about running their latest development in sports car racing: the new Maserati MC12 for the international FIA GT Championship.  The team aided Maserati in testing and developing the car before running the two new racers in their home event at Imola.  Drivers Fabrizio de Simone, Andrea Bertolini, Mika Salo, and Johnny Herbert were all be assigned to the team, eventually earning AF Corse two victories before the season ended.  Once the development of the MC12 was satisfied, the company returned to running the Trofeo Cup, as well as running a Maserati Light in the 2005 Italian GT Championship.

AF Corse returned to the FIA GT Championship in 2006.  This time however they would be running the latest Ferrari offering, the Ferrari F430, as well as competing in the series' lower category, the GT2 class.  Salo was retained in the driving line-up, while newcomers Rui Águas, Jaime Melo, and Matteo Bobbi completed the standard line-up.  Victory was earned in the team's debut at Silverstone, and another two were earned over the season, including at the Spa 24 Hours.  AF Corse won the class championship, beating fellow Ferrari competitor Scuderia Ecosse.  The company retained their connection to Maserati however, entering a trio of cars in the new FIA GT3 European Championship.

As defending champions, AF Corse remained in the FIA GT Championship in 2007, although much on the team changed.  While the Ferrari F430s remained, all new drivers were introduced to the team. Dirk Müller, Toni Vilander, Gianmaria Bruni, and Stephane Ortelli took over driving duties for the season, while Motorola announced their full sponsorship of the squad.  The two cars dominated the 2007 season, winning nine of the ten events on the schedule and wrapping up another championship.

For 2008, AF Corse expanded to a three car team in the GT2 class.  Vilander and Bruni are retained in the lead car, while Biagi returns to the squad to be joined by Christian Montanari in the second entry.  The third car will be run under the Advanced Engineering name, with Argentinian Matías Russo and Luís Pérez Companc.

In 2010, the FIA GT Championship was dissolved and two new championships were born from it. The GT1 class of the former series became the FIA GT1 World Championship while the GT2 class formed the FIA GT2 European Championship. The GT2 series was suspended due to lack of entries. As a result, the AF Corse team joined the Le Mans Series. For the 2010 season, the team fielded three Ferrari F430 GT2s for the series' GT2 class. Drivers Matías Russo and Luís Pérez Companc campaigned the #94 Ferrari with Toni Vilander and former Grand Prix drivers Jean Alesi and Giancarlo Fisichella in the #95. ALMS regulars, with the Risi Competizione team, Jaime Melo and Gianmaria Bruni drove the Ferrari #96.

In 2011 AF Corse entered the Intercontinental Le Mans Cup with brand new Ferrari 458 Italia GT2s as well as the FIA GT3 European Championship with Ferrari 458 Italia GT3s. AF Corse won the ILMC in the GTE-Pro category, including the final round at Petit Le Mans. It also won the FIA GT3 driver's championship with Francisco Catellaci and Federico Leo.

The team also joined the International GT Open for the 2010 season in the Super GT class, which is largely reminiscent of the GT2 rules in the Le Mans Series. The team fields two Ferrari GT2 cars for drivers Jack Gerber & Rui Águas in the #6 car and Pierre Kaffer and Álvaro Barba in the #8 Ferrari. AF Corse will also field a third Ferrari (#7) for the AT Racing team with drivers Alexander Talkanitsa and his son Alexander Talkanitsa Jr.

For 2012, AF Corse competed in a variety of sports car championships throughout Europe and globally, including the FIA World Endurance Championship and GT1 World Championship with Ferrari F458 Italia GT2s and Ferrari F458 Italia GT3s, including a co-branded for GTE-Am class car with Michael Waltrip Racing, AF Waltrip.  At the 24 Hours of Le Mans, amateur driver Piergiuseppe Perazzini collided with the No. 8 Toyota driven by overall-contender Anthony Davidson, sending the Toyota airborne at the Mulsanne Corner.  Perazzini's Ferrari also flipped and landed on its roof after hitting the tyre barrier. Davidson suffered two broken vertebrae in the crash but was able to pull himself from the car in the immediate aftermath of the accident - though of course he was forced to abandon the race. The AF Corse #51 car driven by Gianmaria Bruni, Giancarlo Fisichella and Toni Vilander won the GTE Pro race beating Corvette, Porsche and Aston Martin.

Results

24 Hours of Le Mans

Deutsche Tourenwagen Masters

AF Corse-Waltrip

AF Corse-Waltrip, also known as AF Waltrip, is a former professional sportscar team. The company was a 50–50 partnership between Michael Waltrip Racing NASCAR co-owners Michael Waltrip and Rob Kauffman. In 2011 Michael Waltrip Racing entered into a technical alliance with AF Corse to provide them sportscars to race in the FIA World Endurance Championship and Tudor United SportsCar Championship (formerly Rolex Sports Car Series). AF Corse-Waltrip shut down their sportscar team in 2013 to concentrate on NASCAR.

Racing Results

Complete FIA World Endurance Championship results

 There was no drivers championship that year, the result indicates team rank in the LMGTE Am Trophy.

Rolex Sports Car Series Points

References

External links

 

Italian auto racing teams
1995 establishments in Italy
Auto racing teams established in 1995
24 Hours of Le Mans teams
FIA GT Championship teams
FIA GT1 World Championship teams
European Le Mans Series teams
FIA World Endurance Championship teams
International GT Open teams
Blancpain Endurance Series teams
British GT Championship teams
World Series Formula V8 3.5 teams
WeatherTech SportsCar Championship teams
Deutsche Tourenwagen Masters teams
Ferrari in motorsport